Nikos Nentidis (Greek: Νίκος Νεντίδης; born 7 June 1966) is a Greek retired football defender and later manager.

References

1966 births
Living people
Greek footballers
Apollon Pontou FC players
Olympiacos F.C. players
Iraklis Thessaloniki F.C. players
Greek football managers
Xanthi F.C. managers
Ethnikos Piraeus F.C. managers
Panserraikos F.C. managers
Association football defenders
People from Thessaloniki (regional unit)
Footballers from Central Macedonia